Neurocossus khmer is a moth in the family Cossidae. It is found in Cambodia.

References

Natural History Museum Lepidoptera generic names catalog

Cossinae